Han Xianchu (1913–1986) was a general of the Chinese Communist Party. Han participated in many military campaigns and battles such as Battle of Pingxingguan, Liaoshen Campaign, Pingjin Campaign, Hainan Campaign, and the Korean War. In 1955 he was among the first group of military leaders to be awarded the Shang Jiang (Senior General) rank.

Early life 
Han was born in a farming village in Huang'an County (黄安), modern day Hong'an County (红安), Hubei Province in February, 1913 (Hong An is known for being the hometown of many Military Generals). He stopped schooling and joined the People's Liberation Army when he was 17 and fought his way through countless battles and military campaigns. Han's early military background and tough childhood offered him a revolutionary mindset and a brave character. He had a nickname of "Tornado Commander", indicating his ever-changing tactics in the battlefield and the quick moves like the storm. He was also known as the "Best Field Commander" of PLA.

Early Involvements with the Chinese Communist Party

Joining the party 
Following Kuomintang's (Chinese Nationalist Party) purge of Communists in April 1927, peasant revolts broke out throughout China in the Chinese Civil War. Han joined his local Peasant's Committee and participated in the Huangma Uprising (黄麻起义). The following year, he joined the Grand Union of Anti-Imperialism (反帝大同盟) and in the year after, he joined a Communist youth group. In 1930, Han joined Communist guerrillas in Xiaogan area and officially joined the Chinese Communist Party in October of the same year.

Soaring through the ranks 
In 1931, Han led a squad and operated guerrilla warfare in Hubei. Han showed bravery and perseverance in numerous fights defending the local Communist powers, and proved to be an ardent supporter of the revolution. Han was assigned to the Red Army 25th Army, 75th Division, 225th Regiment, 2nd Battalion, 5th Company as a platoon commander in 1933. In November 1934, the Red 25th Army began a strategic retreat, known as the Long March to avoid annihilation by the Kuomintang. Han performed outstandingly against the pursuers and by the time his regiment arrived in Shaanxi, the destination of the Long March, Han was already promoted to commanding a battalion in the 15th Corps (rename of the 25th Army). Soon after arriving in Shaanxi, Han led his battalion in the Laoshan Campaign (劳山战役). His forces ambushed Nationalist forces and won. After the campaign in October 1935, Han was promoted to Colonel of the 78th Division, 223rd Regiment for efforts in the campaign. He was only 22 years old.

East and West March 
In February, 1936, Han was transferred to the newly established Red 75th Division, 224th Regiment as Colonel, and participated in Mao Zedong's East March (东征). The purpose is to establish a Communist position in Shanxi (山西). In April, Han became Deputy Division Dommander of the 75th Division and one month later, the Division Commander. Soon after returning to Shanbei, Shaanxi, Han joined the West March (西征). Han's forces attacked and occupied Dingbian County (定边县) (disobeying Peng Dehuai, Marshall of the Army at the time, who ordered Han to march around Dingbian City), and Yanchi County (盐池县), destroying the Nationalist's 2 cavalry battalions and 1 security regiment. Over 700 horses and a large quantity of supplies were gained for the Communist war effort.

Shanchengbao Campaign (山城堡战役) 

Not only did Chiang Kai-shek refuse the Communist's plea to unite against the Japanese, he sent the Nationalist 1st, 3rd, 37th, Northeast 67th Armies, including a cavalry Army to destroy the new Communist base in Shaanxi. During the campaign, Han's 15th Corps was assigned to lure the Nationalist's 87th Division to the Shanchengbao area. The Nationalist 87th Division took the bait, and was attacked from 3 sides by Red 15th Corps led by Han and several other corps on November 21, 1936. The battle continued until noon the next day when the Communists successfully destroyed over 1 brigade. Other Nationalist forces were in retreat as well. Shaanxi was successfully defended, and became the heartland of future Communist activities. The Nationalist's failures also promoted the 'Second United Front' against Japan. After the campaign in early 1937, Han went to the military academy in Yan'an to learn strategies against the Japanese Imperial Army.

Second Sino-Japanese War 
Following the full-scale war between the two countries, and according to terms of the 'Second United Front', the 15th Corps was renamed to the National Revolutionary Army's 8th Route Army, 115th Division, 344th Brigade. Han was assigned the 344th Brigade's 688th Regiment's Deputy Colonel.

Battle of Pingxingguan 

In September 1937, Japanese 5th Division, under the command of Itagaki Seishiro, was advancing through Pingxingguan (平型关). Lin Biao's 115th Division, including Han, laid an ambush and defeated the Japanese. The battle resulted in a minor, morale-boosting victory in which the Communists were able to capture a cache of weapons and annihilate a Japanese brigade. After the battle, Han remained stationed at Pingxingguan to halt further Japanese advances.

Hainan Campaign 
Because the disaster of the Battle of Kuningtou, Chinese communist commanders were wary of Island Campaigns, Mao Zedong issued a stand down to frontline commanders like Su Yu, Lin Biao and Chen Yi, to halt all military operations until the Soviet aid arrives. Han, however convinced Lin Biao to give him a chance to attack Hainan Island and the Hainan Campaign was a success. Hainan island was the last location taken over by Mao's forces during the civil war and the nationalists had to give it up and retreat to Taiwan Island with no other choices.

Korean War 
Han was the Commander of 40th Army under 15th Army Group during the Korean War. After the Hainan Campaign in May 1950, 40th Army was assigned as one of the four strategic armies deployed at Henan Province. Soon after the Korean War broke off, 40th Army was sent to Korea as one of the four armies firstly entering Korea. Han was promoted as the Vice Commander in chief of the Chinese People's Volunteer Army. On October 25, 1950, 40th Army fired the first shot of Sino-US military conflict in Korea. China claimed it was the first day of its involvement in Korean War. 40th Army participated 1st, 2nd, 3rd and 4th Phase Offensives. It was the campaign at the West Front that Han was in charge of by heading a small commanding headquarters. For most of the time, his commanding headquarters consisted of only three people and always on the road. Under his command, 116th Division of the 40th Army was the first to capture Seoul on January 6, 1951.

Post-war 

Han served as the first Military Chief of Staff of People's Liberation Army, Deputy Chief of Staff and commander of Military Region, Fuzhou, party first secretary, first secretary of the CPC Fujian Provincial Committee, Lanzhou military commander in chief and party's second secretary of the CPC Central Military Commission members and is on the Standing Committee.

In 1955, Han was awarded the rank of General, an independent Medal of Freedom, a Liberation Medal. He was elected to be on the first session of the CPPCC National Committee and the Fourth National People's Congress, he was on the first, second and third National Defense Commission. In 1958, on the eighth Session of the CPC, Han was the first to be elected to be the alternate member. In February 1967, Han chaired the committee of Fujian front-line troops, the CPC Central Military Commission. In 1983, Han was elected as the Vice Chairman of the National People's Congress Standing Committee, the Chinese Communists ninth, tenth, eleventh, twelfth session of the Central Committee. 
On October 3, 1986, General Han died in Beijing. Marshal Xu Xiangqian complimented General Han as "a heroic warrior." The first President Li Xiannian praised General Han as "a candor, straightforward, righteousness leader." On May 18, 1987, the city Hongan held a grand ceremony for him, and placed his ashes in Hungan military memorial cemetery.

Summary

Han Xianchu (February 1913 – 1986 10.03), Hubei Province, Huangan (now Hongan) County. In 1929, he joined the Chinese Communist Youth League, in 1930 joined the Communist Party of China. During Agrarian Revolutionary War, he served as the Red Army troops-two hundred twenty-five twenty-fifth mission's squad leader, platoon leader, company commander, battalion commander, Red Army fifth regiment, twenty-four, seventy-eighth army commander. He also participated in the Long March. During the Anti-Japanese War, he served as the Deputy Head of Division, at 689 Regiment, Deputy Brigade Commander at 344 Brigade; the Brigade Commander at the 3rd Brigade and Chairman of the new Shandong and Henan Military commander of the Third Military Region of the China People's Anti-Japanese Military. During the Liberation War, he served as the deputy commander of the fourth column at the Northeast Democratic coalition, third column commander of twelve and forty-second of the Fourth Field Army Corps; Deputy commander of the Thirteenth Corps; Deputy commander in chief of the Chinese People's Volunteers Troops, Nineteenth Corps's Commander, Chief of Staff of People's Liberation Army Southeast Military Region, Fuzhou; Deputy Chief of Staff and chief military commander of People's Liberation Army Central Military Region, Lanzhou; he also served as Standing Committee of the CPC Central Military Commission. In 1955, he was awarded the rank of General, a Military Honorable Medal, Medal of Independence and Freedom, Medal of Liberation; he was also on the Standing Committee  serving as Vice Chairman for the Chinese Communist Party National Congress, and was on behalf of the Seventh, Eighth Standing Committee of the Central Committee, ninth, tenth, XI, XII session of the Central Committee.

 List of officers of the People's Liberation Army
 Ranks of the People's Liberation Army
 Chinese Civil War

References

 胆大包天韩先楚 
 开国上将韩先楚
 将军本色韩先楚
 军事家，上将韩先楚
 生平文件韩先楚 

1913 births
1986 deaths
Chinese Communist Party politicians from Hubei
Chinese military personnel of the Korean War
Chinese people of World War II
Chinese revolutionaries
Delegates to the 7th National Congress of the Chinese Communist Party
Governors of Fujian
People's Liberation Army generals from Hubei
People's Republic of China politicians from Hubei
Politicians from Huanggang
Vice Chairpersons of the National People's Congress